Cairnes is a surname. Notable people with the surname include:

Alexander Cairnes (1665–1732), Irish politician and banker
Henry Cairnes (1673–1743), Irish politician, banker, and merchant
Isaac Cairnes (died 1890), American politician
John Elliott Cairnes (1823–1875), Irish economist

See also
Cairnes baronets